Control banding is a qualitative or semi-quantitative risk assessment and management approach to promoting occupational health and safety. It is intended to minimize worker exposures to hazardous chemicals and other risk factors in the workplace and to help small businesses by providing an easy-to-understand, practical approach to controlling hazardous exposures at work. 

The principle of control banding was first applied to dangerous chemicals, chemical mixtures, and fumes. The control banding process emphasizes the controls needed to prevent hazardous substances from causing harm to people at work. The greater the potential for harm, the greater the degree of control needed to manage the situation and make the risk “acceptable.” 

A single control technology or strategy is matched with a single band, or range of exposures (e.g. 1-10 milligrams per cubic meter) for a particular class of chemicals (e.g. skin irritants, reproductive hazards). 

Here is an example of four control bands developed for inhalation hazards.

In the United Kingdom, the Health and Safety Executive (HSE) has developed a comprehensive control banding model called COSHH Essentials (COSHH stands for control of substances hazardous to health.)

The use of control banding strategies has become very popular in the pharmaceutical industry where early stage development compounds may have little or no toxicology data.

Limitations of Control Banding
Control banding is not without limitations and still requires professional knowledge and experience to verify that the control measures specified have been properly installed, maintained, and used. Controls should be validated prior to use by either using substance specific industrial hygiene methods or performing surrogate monitoring.

See also

References

External links
 NIOSH Safety and Health Topic: Control Banding
 COSHH Essentials
 IOHA Control Banding
 BAuA: Easy-to-use control scheme for hazardous substances (EMKG)
 BAuA: EMKG-Expo-Tool for Exposure Assessment (Workers)
 Stoffenmanager
 Chemwatch - Control Banding Risk Assessment Tool

Hazard analysis
Occupational safety and health